Luis Ibarra is the name of

 Luis Ibarra (football manager) (1937-2013), Chilean football manager
 Luis Ibarra (boxer) (born 1953), Panamanian boxer
 Luis Ibarra (athlete) (born 1965), Brazilian marathon runner
 Luis Enrique Ibarra (born 1980), Mexican steeplechase runner